LARU and similar can mean:
 Lambertsen Amphibious Respiratory Unit, an early USA frogman's rebreather
 Laru language spoken in Africa
 Laru, Iran, a village in Kohgiluyeh and Boyer-Ahmad Province, Iran
 The USA railroad reporting code for Lanan, Inc.
 Luxembourg Amateur Radio Union, a national amateur radio organization from Luxembourg

Distinguish from
Larue
LaRue (disambiguation)
La Rue (disambiguation)
Larus, a genus of seagulls.